The Magician is the name of three fictional characters appearing in American comic books published by Marvel Comics.

Publication history
The first version (Lee Guardineer) first appeared in Tales to Astonish #56 (June 1964), and was created by Stan Lee and Dick Ayers. The last name Guardineer is a reference to the Golden Age comics creator Fred Guardineer who created Zatara, Tor, and Merlin the Magnificent who were all magician crimefighters.

Fictional character biography

Lee Guardineer

Lee Guardineer is a stage magician who used his stage acts to rob rich party guests. His activities attracted the attention of Giant-Man's ants who reported this. The Magician then robbed a yacht party run by the rich socialite Sterling Stuyvesant and kidnapped the Wasp to make Giant-Man jealous. In response, Giant-Man set up a phony yacht party which lured the Magician to a trap. Once that trap was sprung, Giant-Man captured the Magician and saved the Wasp. The Magician was fished out of the water by the police and later taken to prison.

While Hank Pym was out of town, the Magician escaped from prison and set up a clothing store with Wasp-inspired clothing. When the Wasp arrived, the Magician attacks in order to capture the Wasp. However, the Wasp soon makes short work of the Magician using quick thinking and the store's many toys to take down the Magician who is promptly arrested by the police.

Sometime later, Lee was released from prison and moved to Tampa with a dancer named Chasity to start a new family where he had a son.

Son of Lee Guardineer

Lee Guardineer had an unnamed son who took up the Magician mantle as part of the "All-New, All-Different Marvel" event. Upon taking his father's mantle, Magician joined the Power Broker's Hench App (a mobile app that enabled people to solicit the service of supervillains). His first job has him hired by publicist Marlena Howard to pretend to have a grudge against Darla Deering for not hiring him for the opening act of the woman's show. The Magician interrupted Deering in the middle of her break-up fight against Ant-Man and confronted the two heroes with genetically-modified rabbits and pigeons. After explaining his origin to Ant-Man, the Magician intentionally lost to Miss Thing. The fight between the Magician and Ant-Man and Darla was staged and filmed because it would make a successful pilot episode for Darla's newest reality show.

Powers and abilities
The Lee Guardineer version of Magician is a skilled stage magician, trickster, and illusionist where his tricks rely on his technology. Besides being a master pickpocket, he is an expert animal trainer and can hypnotize anyone at will. The Magician has a motorized cane with a hatch on top that can act as a vacuum and be used as a divining rod to seek out his enemies.

Other versions

Ultimate Marvel

The Ultimate Marvel version of Magician is Elliot Boggs. His powers first emerged uncontrollably, apparently killing both of his parents. After being subdued by S.H.I.E.L.D., custody of him is given over to Professor Charles Xavier in the hopes Elliot can control his powers. When Elliot awakes, he quickly urges Cyclops to let him join the X-Men. Shorthanded, Cyclops allows Elliot to help the X-Men take on the Brotherhood of Mutant Supremacy attacking the 'Academy of Tomorrow. During the battle, Elliot manages to easily defeat the Blob. Afterwards, he adopts the Magician code name, which is suggested by television reporters. Several of the X-Men observe that the reporters got there amazingly fast, as well as the fact that the Brotherhood had no reason for the initial attack in the first place. After Elliot's interview, the X-Men are on good terms with the press for the first time since Magneto returned after an presumed death.

Later during an attack by the Friends of Humanity on a hospital that gave treatments to mutants (despite there being no mutant patients at the time and in broad daylight), Elliot once again fights alongside the X-Men. It turns out the group's leader is actually a mutant incapacitating the rest of the X-Men leaving only Elliot standing. The young mutant single-handedly defeats the mutant leader. Before the X-Men returned to the mansion, Nick Fury paid Xavier a visit, requesting that Elliot join the Ultimates. However, Xavier refuses to which Fury says Elliot's parents have agreed to their son joining the Ultimates. Xavier is shocked to hear about the boy's parents, as Xavier was told that Elliot had killed his parents. When Fury is unable to recall saying or doing this and only heard of Elliot when he started appearing with the X-Men, Charles realizes something is very wrong.

Charles and Nick believe that Elliot has been messing with their minds, creating the illusion of Nick bringing him to Charles. Fury states that even if Elliot had made everyone forget, there would still be a record on file at S.H.I.E.L.D. The two await Elliott's arrival to confront him. When the jet lands, Charles asks Elliot to "come clean". Xavier confronts him with the truth that his parents are not dead and that Fury never took him to the mansion. When everyone begins attacking him, Elliot tries to make everyone all stop and forget why they are attacking him but this tactic fails to work completely thanks to Charles' interference. Elliot decides he's through playing games and that he could have made the X-Men popular but now he has to kill everyone. However, Elliot is unaware of Jean Grey's presence much to Elliot's surprise.

A battle ensues, in which Magician once again summons the Brotherhood of Mutant Supremacy out of thin air. Magician binds the X-Men in metal and Jean fights the entire Brotherhood alone. Jean speaks psychically to Wolverine and obtains permission to burn away the metal binding him. Wolverine acquiesces and attacks Magician with little or no skin left. As the battle progresses, Wolverine slowly heals, slicing Magician's throat and finally jamming claws through him, apparently making Magician (and all traces of his work) disappear. A conversation between Magician and Kitty Pryde later revealed that Magician simply wants to be left alone and wanted some closure to his story. It is revealed Kitty doesn't see or hear the Magician in any way. Magician states that he will now go somewhere that "there aren't any people, like Antarctica or something."

References

External links
 Magician (Lee Guardineer) at Marvel.com
 Magician of Earth-1610 at Marvel.com
 Magician (Lee Guardineer) at Marvel Wiki
 Magician (Son of Lee Guardineer) at Marvel Wiki
 Magician of Earth-1610 at Marvel Wiki
 Magician (Lee Guardineer) at Comic Vine
 Magician of Earth-1610 at Comic Vine

Characters created by Robert Kirkman
Comics characters introduced in 2006
Fictional characters from parallel universes
Fictional illusionists
Marvel Comics superheroes
Marvel Comics supervillains
Ultimate Marvel characters
X-Men members